Wrong Connection is a 1977 Soviet drama film directed by Viktor Tregubovich.

Plot 
The film tells about the problems of construction: premature commissioning, mismanagement, poor control, theft and deception.

Cast 
 Oleg Yankovsky as Leonid Aleksandrovich Sakulin
 Mikhail Ulyanov as Ignat Maksimovich Nurkov
 Kirill Lavrov as Vladimir Borisovich Okunev
 Lyudmila Gurchenko as Margarita Illarionovna Vyaznikova
 Igor Vladimirov as Rolan Matveyevich Lonshakov
 Mikhail Pogorzhelsky as Pavel Nikolayevich Koznakov
 Vsevolod Kuznetsov as Timonin
 Igor Dmitriev as Gleb Valerianovich Artyushkin
 Dmitri Krivtsov as Viktor Grigorevich Ablov
 Yelena Stavrogina as Vera Vasilyeva

References

External links 
 

1977 films
1970s Russian-language films
Soviet drama films
1977 drama films